Take Offs and Landings is Rilo Kiley's debut full-length album, originally released in 2001 on the vanity label "Rilo Records", then shortly thereafter on the independent label Barsuk Records. It was released for the first time on vinyl on March 15, 2011.

Of Rilo Kiley's albums, Take Offs and Landings contains the most songs sung by band member Blake Sennett, who sings lead on "August", "Small Figures in a Vast Expanse", "Rest of My Life", and a hidden track. Jenny Lewis sings lead on the other tracks, except for the instrumental tracks "Variations on a Theme (Science vs. Romance)" and "Variations on a Theme (Plane Crash in C)".

The album's hidden track, which did not appear on the first pressing, is officially titled "Spectacular Views". However, since a later Rilo Kiley song (the closing track to The Execution of All Things) has the same name, it is often referred to as "Salute My Shorts!", in reference to Sennett's acting role on the Nickelodeon television show Salute Your Shorts.

As of July 2006, the album has sold 66,000 copies in United States.

Track listing
All songs written by Jenny Lewis and Blake Sennett.

Personnel
Jenny Lewis – vocals, keyboards, guitar
Blake Sennett – guitar, keyboards, vocals
Pierre de Reeder – bass guitar, guitar, backing vocals
Dave Rock – drums, percussion

Additional musicians
Phillip Watt - trumpet on "Pictures of Success," "Plane Crash in C," and "Don't Deconstruct"
Alex Greenwald - synths on "Pictures of Success" and "Plane Crash in C"
Shana Levy - keyboard on "Go Ahead"
Larissa Brantner - violin on "Don't Deconstruct" and "Rest of My Life"
Aram Arsalanian - keyboard on "Plane Crash in C"
Ben Boyer - drums on "We'll Never Sleep (God Knows We'll Try)"
Danny Cooksey - backing vocals on "Science vs. Romance" and "Always"

References

2001 debut albums
Rilo Kiley albums
Barsuk Records albums
Albums about aircraft